The efficiency of a plant is the percentage of the total energy content of a power plant's fuel that is converted into electricity. The remaining energy is usually lost to the environment as heat unless it is used for district heating.
 

Rating efficiency is complicated by the fact that there are two different ways to measure the fuel energy input:
 LCV = Lower Calorific Value (same as NCV = Net Calorific Value) neglects thermal energy gained from exhaust H2O condensation
 HCV = Higher Calorific Value (same as GCV, Gross Calorific Value) includes exhaust H2O condensed to liquid water
Depending on which convention is used, a differences of 10% in the apparent efficiency of a gas fired plant can arise, so it is very important to know which convention, HCV or LCV (NCV or GCV) is being used.

Heat rate 

Heat rate is a term commonly used in power stations to indicate the power plant efficiency.  
The heat rate is the inverse of the efficiency: a lower heat rate is better.

The term efficiency is a dimensionless measure (sometimes quoted in percent), and strictly heat rate is dimensionless as well, but often written as energy per energy in relevant units. In SI-units it is joule per joule, but often also expressed as joule/kilowatt hour or British thermal units/kWh. This is because kilowatt hour is often used when referring to electrical energy and joule or Btu is commonly used when referring to thermal energy.

Heat rate in the context of power plants can be thought of as the input needed to produce one unit of output. It generally indicates the amount of fuel required to generate one unit of electricity. Performance parameters tracked for any thermal power plant like efficiency, fuel costs, plant load factor, emissions level, etc. are a function of the station heat rate and can be linked directly.

Given that heat rate and efficiency are inversely related to each other, it is easy to convert from one to the other.
A 100% efficiency implies equal input and output: for 1 kWh of output, the input is 1 kWh. This thermal energy input of 1 kWh = 3.6 MJ = 3,412 Btu
Therefore, the heat rate of a 100% efficient plant is simply 1, or 1 kWh/kWh, or 3.6 MJ/kWh, or 3,412 Btu/kWh
To express the efficiency of a generator or power plant as a percentage, invert the value if dimensionless notation or same unit are used. For example:
A heat rate value of 5 gives an efficiency factor of 20%.
A heat rate value of 2 kWh/kWh gives an efficiency factor of 50%.
A heat rate value of 4 MJ/MJ gives an efficiency factor of 25%. 
For other units, make sure to use a corresponding conversion factor for the units. For example if using Btu/kWh, use a conversion factor of 3,412 Btu per kWh to calculate the efficiency factor.  For example, if the heat rate is 10,500 Btu/kWh, the efficiency is 32.5% (since 3,412 Btu / 10,500 Btu = 32.5%). 
The higher the heat rate (i.e. the more energy input that is required to produce one unit of electric output), the lower the efficiency of the power plant.
The U.S. Energy Information Administration gives a general explanation for how to translate a heat rate value into a power plant's efficiency value. 

Most power plants have a target or design heat rate. If the actual heat rate does not match the target, the difference between the actual and target heat rate is the heat rate deviation.

See also

Fuel efficiency
Energy conversion efficiency
Thermal efficiency
Electrical efficiency
Mechanical efficiency
Cost of electricity by source

References

Thermodynamic properties
Energy conversion
Energy conservation
Engineering thermodynamics
Energy economics
Power stations